Adelaide Orsola Appignani (1807 – 30 September 1884) was an Italian singer, conductor, music educator and composer.

Life
Adelaide Orsola Appignani (also known as Orsola Aspri) was born in Rome. After her widowed mother married the violinist Andrea Aspri, Appignani changed her name to Orsola Aspri.

She studied music under Valentino Fioravanti. After completing her studies, she was active as a singer and a conductor in Florence and Rome in 1839. She was a member of the Roman Academie Filarmonica at Pallazio Lancelotti and was granted an honorary membership in 1842 of the Academie de St. Cecelia.

Appignani also taught singing and had as her student the tenor Settimio Malvezzi.

She married Count Girolamo Cenci-Bolognetti. Appignani died 30 September 1884 in Rome.

Works
Her selected works include:

Le advventure de una giornata (melodrama) 1827
I riti indiani (opera) 1834
I pirati (melodrama) 1843
Clara de Clevers (melodrama) 1876
Sinfonia for instruments (symphony), 1834
Le redenzioni de Roma (cantata) 1871

References

Italian women classical composers
Italian music educators
Voice teachers
1807 births
1884 deaths
Italian classical composers
Musicians from Rome
19th-century Italian composers
19th-century classical composers
19th-century Italian women
Women music educators
19th-century women composers